Changzhou or Chang Prefecture was a zhou (prefecture) in imperial China, centering on modern Changzhou, Jiangsu, China. It existed (intermittently) from 589 until 1277, when the Yuan dynasty renamed it Changzhou Route.

The modern prefecture-level city Changzhou, created in 1949, retains its name.

Geography
The administrative region of Chang Prefecture in the Tang dynasty was in modern southern Jiangsu directly to the north of Lake Tai. It probably includes parts of modern: 
Under the administration of Changzhou:
Changzhou
Under the administration of Wuxi:
Wuxi
Jiangyin
Yixing

See also
Jinling Commandery
Changzhou Route

References
 

Prefectures of the Sui dynasty
Prefectures of the Tang dynasty
Prefectures of Yang Wu
Prefectures of Southern Tang
Liangzhe West Circuit
Former prefectures in Jiangsu